Condición suspendida is an outdoor sculpture by Gonzalo Lebrija, installed in Zapopan, in the Mexican state of Jalisco. It is found outside Zapopan Centro station of the Guadalajara light rail system, in front of the Arcos de Zapopan.

References

External links

 

2021 sculptures
Outdoor sculptures in Jalisco
Zapopan
Colossal statues